The 2007 Brasil Open was an ATP Tour tennis tournament held in Costa do Sauípe resort, Mata de São João, Brazil from 12 February until 19 February 2007. Guillermo Cañas won his first title since October 1

Champions

 Guillermo Cañas defeated  Juan Carlos Ferrero 7–6(7–4), 6–2

Doubles

 Lukáš Dlouhý /  Pavel Vízner defeated  Albert Montañés /  Rubén Ramírez Hidalgo 6–2, 7–6(7–4)

External links 
 Brasil Open ATP Tennis profile